Paschendale is a locality in south west Victoria, Australia.

Traditional ownership
The formally recognised traditional owners for the area in which Paschendale sits are the Gunditjmara People who are represented by the Gunditj Mirring Traditional Owners Aboriginal Corporation.

References

External links

Towns in Victoria (Australia)